Chunta Pata (Aymara for prolonged, pata step, "prolonged step", also spelled Chuntapata) is a mountain in the Wansu mountain range in the Andes of Peru, about  high. It is located in the Arequipa Region, La Unión Province, Huaynacotas District. It lies southwest of Q'illu Urqu.

References 

Mountains of Peru
Mountains of Arequipa Region